Heaven's Gate was an American new religious movement (often described as a cult), founded in 1974 and led by Bonnie Nettles (1927–1985) and Marshall Applewhite (1931–1997), known within the movement as Ti and Do, respectively. Ti and Do first met in 1972 and went on a journey of spiritual discovery, identifying themselves as the two witnesses of Revelation, attracting a following of several hundred people in the mid-1970s. In 1976, the group stopped recruiting and instituted a monastic lifestyle.

Scholars have described the theology of Heaven's Gate as a mixture of Christian millenarianism, New Age, and ufology, and as such it has been characterized as a UFO religion. The central belief of the group was that followers could transform themselves into immortal extraterrestrial beings by rejecting their human nature, and they would ascend to heaven, referred to as the "Next Level" or "The Evolutionary Level Above Human". The death of Nettles from cancer in 1985 challenged the group's views on ascension, where they originally believed that they would ascend to heaven while alive aboard a UFO, they later came to believe that the body was merely a "container" or "vehicle" for the soul, and that their consciousness would be transferred to new "Next Level bodies" upon death.

On March 26, 1997, deputies of the San Diego County Sheriff's Department discovered the bodies of the 39 active members of the group, including that of Applewhite, in a house in the San Diego suburb of Rancho Santa Fe. They had participated in a mass suicide, a coordinated series of ritual suicides, coinciding with the closest approach of Comet Hale–Bopp. Just before the mass suicide; the group's website was updated with the message: "Hale–Bopp brings closure to Heaven's Gate...our 22 years of classroom here on planet Earth is finally coming to conclusion—'graduation' from the Human Evolutionary Level. We are happily prepared to leave 'this world' and go with Ti's crew."

The name "Heaven's Gate" was only used for the final few years of the group's existence, and they had previously been known under the names Human Individual Metamorphosis and Total Overcomers Anonymous.

History 

The son of a Presbyterian minister and a former soldier, Marshall Applewhite began his foray into Biblical prophecy in the early 1970s. After being fired from the University of St. Thomas in Houston, Texas, over an alleged relationship with one of his male students, he met Bonnie Nettles, a 44-year-old married nurse with an interest in theosophy and Biblical prophecy, in March 1972. The circumstances of their meeting are unclear. According to Applewhite's writings, the two met in a hospital where she worked while he was visiting a sick friend there. It has been rumored that it was a psychiatric hospital, but another account had Nettles substituting for a nurse working with premature babies in the nursery. Applewhite later recalled that he felt that he had known Nettles for a long time and concluded that they had met in a past life. She told him their meeting had been foretold to her by extraterrestrials, persuading him that he had a divine assignment.

Applewhite and Nettles pondered the life of St. Francis of Assisi and read works by Helena Blavatsky, R. D. Laing, and Richard Bach. They kept a King James Bible and studied passages from the New Testament focusing on Christology, asceticism, and eschatology. Applewhite also read science fiction, including works by Robert A. Heinlein and Arthur C. Clarke. By June 19, Applewhite and Nettles's beliefs had solidified. They concluded that they had been chosen to fulfill biblical prophecies, and that they had been given higher-level minds than other people. They wrote a pamphlet that described Jesus' reincarnation as a Texan, a veiled reference to Applewhite. Furthermore, they concluded that they were the two witnesses described in the Book of Revelation and occasionally visited churches or other spiritual groups to speak of their identities, often referring to themselves as "The Two", or "The UFO Two". They believed they would be killed and then resurrected and, in view of others, transported onto a spaceship. This event, which they referred to as "the Demonstration", was to prove their claims. To their dismay, these ideas were poorly received by other religious groups.

The Two would gain their first follower, Sharon Morgan, in May 1974, abandoning her children to join them. A month later Sharon left The Two and returned to her family. Nettles and Applewhite were arrested and charged with credit card fraud for using Morgan's cards, despite the fact that she had consented to their use. The charges were later dropped. However a routine check brought up that Applewhite had stolen a rental car from St. Louis nine months earlier, which he still possessed. Applewhite then spent six months in jail primarily in Missouri, and was released in early 1975, subsequently rejoining Nettles.

Eventually, Applewhite and Nettles resolved to contact extraterrestrials, and they sought like-minded followers. They published advertisements for meetings, where they recruited disciples, whom they called "the crew". At the events, they purported to represent beings from another planet, the Next Level, who sought participants for an experiment. They stated that those who agreed to take part in the experiment would be brought to a higher evolutionary level. In April 1975, during a meeting with a metaphysical group of eighty people led by Clarence Klug in Joan Culpepper's Studio City, Los Angeles home, they shared their "simultaneous" revelation that they had been told they were the two witnesses in the Bible's story of the end time. According to Benjamin Zeller, while accounts of the meeting differ, all describe it as momentous and agree that Applewhite and Nettles presented themselves as charismatic leaders with an important spiritual message. Around 25 individuals were induced to join the group.

Later, in September 1975, Applewhite and Nettles preached at a motel hall in Waldport, Oregon. After selling all "worldly" possessions and saying farewell to loved ones, around 20 people vanished from the public eye and joined the group. Later that year, on CBS Evening News, Walter Cronkite reported on the disappearances in one of the first national reports on the developing religious group: "A score of persons... have disappeared. It's a mystery whether they've been taken on a so-called trip to eternity — or simply been taken." In reality, Applewhite and Nettles had arranged for the group to go underground. From that point, "Do and Ti" (pronounced "doe and tee"), as the two now called themselves, led nearly one hundred members across the country, sleeping in tents and sleeping bags and begging in the streets. Evading detection by the authorities and media enabled the group to focus on Do and Ti's doctrine of helping members of the crew achieve a "higher evolutionary level" above human, which they claimed to have already reached.

Applewhite and Nettles used a variety of aliases over the years, notably "Bo and Peep" and "Do and Ti". The group also had several names prior to the adoption of the name Heaven's Gate. At the time Vallée studied the group it was known as Human Individual Metamorphosis (HIM). The group re-invented and renamed itself several times and had a variety of recruitment methods.

Applewhite believed he was directly related to Jesus, meaning he was an "Evolutionary Kingdom Level Above Human". His writings, which combined aspects of Millennialism, Gnosticism, and science fiction, suggest he believed himself to be Jesus' successor and the "Present Representative" of Christ on Earth. Do and Ti taught early on that Do's bodily "vehicle" was inhabited by the same alien spirit which belonged to Jesus; likewise, Ti (Nettles) was presented as God the Father.

The crew used numerous methods of recruitment as they toured the United States in destitution, proclaiming the gospel of higher level metamorphosis, the deceit of humans by false-god spirits, envelopment with sunlight for meditative healing, and the divinity of the "UFO Two".

In April 1976, the group stopped recruiting and became reclusive, and instituted a rigid set of behavioral guidelines, including banning sexual activity and the use of drugs. Applewhite and Nettles also solidified their temporal and religious authority over the group. Benjamin Zeller described the movement as having transformed "from a loosely organised social group to a centralized religious movement comparable to a roving monastery".

Some sociologists agree that the popular movement of alternative religious experience and individualism found in collective spiritual experiences during that period helped contribute to the growth of the new religious movement. "Sheilaism", as it became known, was a way for people to merge their diverse religious backgrounds and coalesce around a shared, generalized faith, which followers of new religious sects like Applewhite's crew found to be an appetizing alternative to traditional dogmas in Judaism, Catholicism and evangelical Christianity. Many of Applewhite and Nettles' crew hailed from these diverse backgrounds; most of them are described by researchers as having been "longtime truth-seekers", or spiritual hippies who had long since believed in attempting to "find themselves" through spiritual means, combining faiths in a sort of cultural milieu well into the mid-1980s. However, not all of Applewhite's crew were hippies recruited from alternative religious backgrounds— one such recruit early on was John Craig, a respected Republican and ranch owner who came close to winning a 1970 Colorado House of Representatives race, who joined the group in 1975. As numbers grew in its pre-Internet days, the clan of "UFO followers" seemed to have in common a need for communal belonging to an alternative path to higher existence outside the constraints of institutionalized faith.

Identifying themselves by the business name "Higher Source", they used their website to proselytize and recruit followers beginning in the early 1990s. Rumors began spreading among the group in the following years that the upcoming Comet Hale–Bopp housed the secret to their ultimate salvation and ascent into the kingdom of heaven.

Contemporary media coverage 

Heaven's Gate received coverage in Jacques Vallée's book Messengers of Deception (1979), in which Vallée described an unusual public meeting organized by the group. Vallée expressed concerns about contactee groups' authoritarian political and religious outlooks, and Heaven's Gate did not escape criticism. Known to the media (though largely ignored), Heaven's Gate was better known in UFO circles, and through a series of academic studies by sociologist Robert Balch.

In January 1994, the LA Weekly ran an article on the group, then known as "The Total Overcomers". Richard Ford, who would later play a key role in the 1997 group suicide, discovered Heaven's Gate through this article and eventually joined them, renaming himself Rio DiAngelo.

Coast to Coast AM host Art Bell discussed the theory of the "companion object" in the shadow of Hale–Bopp on several programs as early as November 1996. Speculation has been raised as to whether Bell's programs contributed to Heaven's Gate's group suicide, which Knowledge Fight host Dan Friesen blames more on Courtney Brown rather than Bell.

Louis Theroux contacted Heaven's Gate for his BBC2 documentary series, Louis Theroux's Weird Weekends, in early March 1997. In response to his e-mail, Theroux was told that Heaven's Gate could not take part in the documentary because "at the present time a project like this would be an interference with what we must focus on."

Mass suicide 

In October 1996, the group rented a large home which they called "The Monastery", a  mansion located near 18341 Colina Norte (later changed to Paseo Victoria) in Rancho Santa Fe, California. They paid $7,000 per month, in cash. The same month, the group purchased alien abduction insurance that would cover up to fifty members and would pay out $1 million per person (the policy covered abduction, impregnation, or death by aliens). Prior to this, in June 1995 they had purchased land near Manzano, New Mexico and began creating a compound out of rubber tires and concrete, but had left abruptly in April 1996.

On March 1920, 1997, Marshall Applewhite taped himself in Do's Final Exit, speaking of mass suicide and "the only way to evacuate this Earth". After asserting that a spacecraft was trailing Comet Hale–Bopp and that this event would represent the "closure to Heaven's Gate", Applewhite persuaded 38 followers to prepare for ritual suicide so their souls could board the supposed craft. Applewhite believed that after their deaths an unidentified flying object (UFO) would take their souls to another "level of existence above human", which he described as being both physical and spiritual. Their preparations included each member videotaping a farewell message.

To kill themselves, members took phenobarbital mixed with apple sauce or pudding and washed it down with vodka. After ingesting the applesauce/pudding mix, they secured plastic bags around their heads to induce asphyxiation. All 39 were dressed in identical black shirts and sweat pants, brand new black-and-white Nike Decades athletic shoes, and armband patches reading "Heaven's Gate Away Team" (one of many instances of the group's use of the nomenclature of the fictional universe of Star Trek). Each member carried a five-dollar bill and three quarters in their pockets. According to former members, this was standard for members leaving the home for jobs and "a humorous way to tell us they all had left the planet permanently"; the five-dollar bill was for covering the cost of vagrancy laws and the quarters were for calling home from pay phones, although another former member known as "Sawyer" stated that it was a reference to a Mark Twain story which said $5.75 was "the cost to ride the tail of a comet to heaven." After each one died, a living member would arrange the body by removing the plastic bag from the person's head, followed by posing the body so that it lay neatly in its own bed, with faces and torsos covered by a square purple cloth for privacy. In an interview with Harry Robinson, the two surviving members said that the identical clothing was a uniform representing unity for the mass suicide, while the Nike Decades were chosen because the group "got a good deal on the shoes". Applewhite was also a fan of Nikes "and therefore everyone was expected to wear and like Nikes" within the group. Heaven's Gate also had a saying 'Just Do it,' echoing Nike's slogan. They pronounced Do as Doe, to reflect Applewhite's nickname.

The 39 adherents, 21 women and 18 men between the ages of 26 and 72, are believed to have died in three groups over three successive days, with remaining participants cleaning up after each prior group's deaths.
The suicides occurred in groups of fifteen, fifteen, and nine, between approximately March 22 and March 26. Among the dead was Thomas Nichols, brother of the actress Nichelle Nichols, who was best known for her role as Uhura in the original television series of Star Trek. Leader Applewhite was the third to last member to die; two people remained after him and were the only ones found with bags over their heads and not having purple cloths covering their top halves. Before the last of the suicides, similar sets of packages were sent to numerous Heaven's Gate affiliated (or formerly affiliated) individuals, and at least one media outlet, the BBC department responsible for Louis Theroux's Weird Weekends, for which Heaven's Gate had earlier declined participation.

Among those in the list of recipients was Rio DiAngelo. The package DiAngelo received on the evening of March 25, as other packages sent had, contained two VHS videotapes, one with Do's Final Exit, and the other with the "farewell messages" of group followers. It also contained a letter, stating that among other things, "we have exited our vehicles, just as we entered them." DiAngelo informed his boss of the contents of the packages and then received a ride from him from Los Angeles to the Heaven's Gate home in Rancho Santa Fe so he could verify the letter. DiAngelo found a back door intentionally left unlocked to allow access, and used a video camera to record what he found. After leaving the house, DiAngelo's boss, who had waited outside, encouraged him to make calls alerting the authorities.

The San Diego County Sheriff's Department received an anonymous tip through the 911 system at 3:15 p.m. on March 26, suggesting they "check on the welfare of the residents". Days after the suicides, the caller was revealed to be DiAngelo.

The lone deputy who first responded to the call entered the home through a side door, saw ten bodies, and was nearly overcome by a "pungent odor". (The bodies were already decomposing in the hot California spring.) After a cursory search by two more deputies found no one alive, they retreated until a search warrant could be procured. All 39 bodies were ultimately cremated.

Aftermath 

The Heaven's Gate deaths were widely publicized in the media as an example of mass suicide. When the news broke of its relation to Comet Hale–Bopp, the co-discoverer of the comet, Alan Hale, was drawn into the story. Hale's phone "never stopped ringing the entire day". He chose not to respond until he spoke the next day at a press conference, after researching the details of the incident. Speaking at the Second World Skeptics Congress in Heidelberg, Germany on July 24, 1998:

Hale said that well before Heaven's Gate, he had told a colleague:

News of the 39 deaths in Rancho Santa Fe motivated the copycat suicide of a 58-year-old man living near Marysville, California. The man left a note dated March 27, which said, "I'm going on the spaceship with Hale-Bopp to be with those who have gone before me," and imitated some of the details of the Heaven's Gate suicides as they had then been reported. The man was found dead by a friend on March 31, and had no known connection with Heaven's Gate.

At least three former members of Heaven's Gate died by suicide in the months following the mass suicide. On May 6, 1997, Wayne Cooke and Chuck Humphrey attempted suicide in a hotel in a manner similar to that used by the group. Cooke died but Humphrey survived. Another former member, James Pirkey Jr., died by suicide by a self-inflicted gunshot wound on May 11. Humphrey, who had survived his first attempt, ultimately killed himself in Arizona in February 1998.

Although most people considered the event a mass suicide, sociologist and former member of a cult, Janja Lalich, has referred to the event as "murder".

Two former members, Marc and Sarah King of Phoenix, Arizona, operating as the TELAH Foundation, are believed to maintain the group's website.   there has been no evident growth, as after the mass suicide the group fell into obscurity, relying mainly on their website for recruitment.

Belief system 
Scholars disagree over whether the theology of Heaven's Gate is fundamentally either New Age or Christian in nature. Benjamin Zeller has argued that the theology of Heaven's Gate was primarily rooted in Evangelicalism but with New Age elements and a hermeneutic interpretation of the Bible read through the lens of extraterrestrial contact.

Initially, the group had been told that they would be biologically and chemically transformed into extraterrestrial beings and would be transported aboard a spacecraft, which would come to Earth and take them to heaven - referred to as the "Next Level". When Bonnie Lou Nettles (Ti) died of cancer in 1985, the group's doctrine was confounded because Nettles was allegedly chosen by the Next Level to be a messenger on Earth, yet her body had died instead of leaving physically to outer space. Their belief system was then revised to include the leaving of consciousness from the body as equivalent to leaving the Earth in a spacecraft.

The group declared that they were against suicide, as they defined "suicide" in their own context to mean "to turn against the Next Level when it is being offered" and believed their "human" bodies were only "vehicles" meant to help them on their journey. Suicide, therefore, would be not allowing their consciousness to leave their human bodies to join the next level; remaining alive instead of participating in the group suicide was considered suicide of their consciousness. In conversation, when referring to a person or a person's body, they routinely used the word "vehicle".

The members of the group gave themselves three letter names with the suffix -ody that they adopted in lieu of their original given names, which defines "children of the Next Level". This is mentioned in Applewhite's final video, Do's Final Exit, filmed March 19–20, 1997, just days prior to the suicides.

They believed that, "to be eligible for membership in the Next Level, humans would have to shed every attachment to the planet". This meant all members had to give up all human-like characteristics, such as their family, friends, gender, sexuality, individuality, jobs, money, and possessions.

"The Evolutionary Level Above Human" (TELAH) was as a "physical, corporeal place", another world in our universe, where residents live in pure bliss and nourish themselves by absorbing pure sunlight. At the next level, beings do not engage in sexual intercourse, eating or dying, the things that make us "mammalian" here. Heaven's Gate believed that what the Bible calls God is actually a highly developed Extraterrestrial.

Members of Heaven's Gate believed that evil space aliens—called Luciferians—falsely represented themselves to Earthlings as "God" and conspired to keep humans from developing. Technically advanced humanoids, these aliens have spacecraft, space-time travel, telepathy, and increased longevity. They use holograms to fake miracles. Carnal beings with gender, they stopped training to achieve the Kingdom of God thousands of years ago. Heaven's Gate believed that all existing religions on Earth had been corrupted by these malevolent aliens.

Although these basic beliefs of the group stayed generally consistent over the years, "the details of their ideology were flexible enough to undergo modification over time." There are examples of the group's adding to or slightly changing their beliefs, such as: modifying the way one can enter the Next Level, changing the way they described themselves, placing more importance on the idea of Satan, and adding several other New Age concepts. One of these concepts was the belief of extraterrestrial walk-ins; when the group began, "Applewhite and Nettles taught their followers that they were extraterrestrial beings. However, after the notion of walk-ins became popular within the New Age subculture, the Two changed their tune and began describing themselves as extraterrestrial walk-ins." The idea of walk-ins is very similar to the concept of being possessed by spirits. A walk-in can be defined as "an entity who occupies a body that has been vacated by its original soul". Heaven's Gate came to believe an extraterrestrial walk-in is "a walk-in that is supposedly from another planet".

The concept of walk-ins aided Applewhite and Nettles in personally starting from what they considered to be clean slates. In this so-called clean slate, they were no longer considered by members of this Heaven's Gate group to be the people they had been prior to the start of the group, but had taken on a new life; this concept gave them a way to "erase their human personal histories as the histories of souls who formerly occupied the bodies of Applewhite and Nettles". Over time Applewhite also revised his identity in the group to encourage the belief that the "walk in" that was inhabiting his body was the same that had done so to Jesus 2,000 years ago. Similar to Nestorianism this belief stated that the personage of Jesus and the spirit of Jesus were separable. This meant that Jesus was simply the name of the body of an ordinary man that held no sacred properties that was taken over by an incorporeal sacred entity to deliver "next level" information.

Another New Age belief Applewhite and Nettles adopted was the ancient astronaut hypothesis. The term "ancient astronauts" is used to refer to various forms of the concept that extraterrestrials visited Earth in the distant past. Applewhite and Nettles took part of this concept and taught it as the belief that "aliens planted the seeds of current humanity millions of years ago, and have to come to reap the harvest of their work in the form of spiritually evolved individuals who will join the ranks of flying saucer crews. Only a select few members of humanity will be chosen to advance to this transhuman state. The rest will be left to wallow in the spiritually poisoned atmosphere of a corrupt world." Only the individuals who chose to join Heaven's Gate, follow Applewhite and Nettle's belief system, and make the sacrifices required by membership would be allowed to escape human suffering.

Techniques to enter the next level 

According to Heaven's Gate, once the individual has perfected himself through the "process", there were four methods to enter or "graduate" to the next level:

 Physical pickup onto a TELAH spacecraft and transfer to a next level body aboard that craft. In this version, what Professor Zeller calls a "UFO" version of the "Rapture", an alien spacecraft would descend to Earth and collect Applewhite, Nettles, and their followers, and their human bodies would be transformed through biological and chemical processes to perfected beings. This and other UFO-related beliefs held by the group have led some observers to characterize the group as a type of UFO religion.
 Natural death, accidental death, or death from random violence. Here, the "graduating soul" leaves the human container for a perfected next-level body.
 Outside persecution that leads to death. After the deaths of the Branch Davidians in Waco, Texas, and the events involving Randy Weaver at Ruby Ridge, Applewhite was afraid the American government would murder the members of Heaven's Gate.
 Willful exit from the body in a dignified manner. Near the end, Applewhite had a revelation that they might have to abandon their human bodies and achieve the next level as Jesus had done. This occurred on March 22 and 23 when 39 members died by suicide and "graduated".

Structure 

In a group open only to adults over the age of 18, members gave up their possessions and lived an ascetic life devoid of indulgences. The group was tightly knit and everything was communally shared. In public, each member of the group always carried a five-dollar bill and a roll of quarters. Eight of the male members of the group, including Applewhite, voluntarily underwent castration as an extreme means of maintaining the ascetic lifestyle. The group initially attempted castration by having one of its members, a former nurse, perform the castration, but this attempt was unsuccessful, almost resulted in the patient's death, and caused at least one member to leave Heaven's Gate. Every castration that followed the first one was done in a hospital.

The group earned revenue by offering professional website development under the business name Higher Source.

The cultural theorist Paul Virilio described the group as a cybersect, due to its heavy reliance on computer mediated communication prior to its collective suicide.

In popular culture 
In 1979, Gary Sherman produced the made-for-TV movie Mysterious Two for NBC, based on the exploits of Applewhite and Nettles, then relatively unknown, which aired in 1982. In its first live episode following the mass suicide, Saturday Night Live aired a sketch where the cult members made it to space. It was followed by a commercial parody for Keds, featuring the tagline, "Worn by level-headed Christians," as well as footage of the Nike-clad corpses of the Heaven's Gate members. Heaven's Gate: The Cult of Cults, a documentary miniseries about the cult, was released on HBO Max in 2020. In 2021, Heaven's Gate was one of the subjects in the first season of Vice Media's documentary television series Dark Side of the 90's entitled "A Tale of Two Cults". The cult is also parodied on Seth MacFarlane's adult animated series Family Guy in an episode titled "Chitty Chitty Death Bang" aired in April 1999.

Heaven's Gate was the subject of the 10-part podcast of the same name produced by Glynn Washington to commemorate the 20th anniversary of the mass suicide. They have also been the subject of numerous other podcasts.

Nike Decade
The infamy caused by the mass suicides, limited availability, and their sudden and unceremonious discontinuation have been cited as reasons for the high resale value of Nike Decades.

See also 

UFO religion
Training centre for release of the Atma-energy, a new religious movement founded in 1994 that also believed a spacecraft would take them, which led to their alleged mass suicide at the Teide National Park
Branch Davidians, another new religious movement founded in 1955 that became infamous in the 1990s
Waco siege, a 1993 51-day standoff that ended in the burning deaths of 76 members
 Peoples Temple
Jonestown, an acre of land in Guyana where in 1978, 909 people died in the compound (and 9 others outside)
Movement for the Restoration of the Ten Commandments of God
2000 Uganda cult massacres
Order of the Solar Temple
Aum Shinrikyo subway sarin attack

References

Bibliography

External links 

 
 
 
 Heaven's Gate Podcast  providing more in-depth information, including interviews with former members and relatives
 Heaven's Gate VHS Tapes at Internet Archive
 College Lecture on Heaven's Gate at Internet Archive

 
UFO religions
1974 establishments in Texas
1997 disestablishments in California
Mass suicides
Cults
Religious organizations established in 1974
Religious organizations disestablished in 1997
Apocalyptic groups
Religious belief systems founded in the United States
Ancient astronaut speculation
Christian new religious movements
New Age organizations